Puksinhyŏn station is a railway station in Puksinhyŏl-li, Hyangsan county, North P'yŏngan province, North Korea on the Manp'o Line of the Korean State Railway; it was also the starting point of the narrow-gauge Unsan Line to Samsan.

History

The station was opened on 1 November 1934 by the Chosen Government Railway, along with the rest of the fourth section of the Manp'o Line from Kujang to Hŭich'ŏn.

References

Railway stations in North Korea